Dale Wilson is a Canadian voice actor. He has appeared in many cartoons: G.I Joe 1989 DiC series voicing numerous characters such as the narrator of the opening, as well as Capt. Grid-Iron, Mutt, Overkill, Skydive; Gary Larson's Tales from the Far Side, as Edward Kelly, the mutant-hating high school principal; in X-Men: Evolution; and as Paw Pooch in Krypto the Superdog. He was the announcer for the opening and closing ceremonies at the 2010 Winter Olympics in Vancouver. He has also appeared in films, including Who'll Save Our Children? (1978) and Dead Wrong (1983).

Dubbing roles

Animation

Film

Filmography

Animation

Film

References

External links
 Dale Wilson Voiceovers (copy archived January 2019)

Living people
Canadian male film actors
Canadian male television actors
Canadian male video game actors
Canadian male voice actors
Year of birth missing (living people)